Jeanne Bates (May 21, 1918 – November 28, 2007) was an American radio, film and television actress. After performing in radio serials, she signed a contract with Columbia Pictures in 1942 which began her career in films both in bit parts and larger roles in a series of horror films and noirs, including The Return of the Vampire (1943) and Shadows in the Night (1946).

In her later career, Bates would collaborate with David Lynch on his films Eraserhead (1977) and Mulholland Drive (2001), the latter of which was her last film credit before her death in 2007.

Career
Bates was born in Berkeley, California in 1918. She began her acting career while attending San Mateo Junior College, with roles on radio soap operas produced in San Francisco. Bates had the lead role, and supplied the signature scream, on the radio mystery series Whodunit. Following the war, the show was revived under the name "Murder Will Out."  In 1943, she married the writer of Whodunit, Lew X. Lansworth (1904–1981).  Bates also appeared in radio's "Gunsmoke", including the 12/13/1952 episode "Post Martin" and the 10/23/1960 episode "Newsma'am".

She also had her film debut in 1943, in a Boston Blackie mystery, The Chance of a Lifetime. She played Bela Lugosi's first victim in The Return of the Vampire (1943), Anne Winson in The Soul of a Monster (1944), Victoria in The Mask of Diijon (1946), Diana Palmer in The Phantom serial (1943), Agnes in Back from the Dead (film) (1957), and she also had a minor role in Death of a Salesman (1951).

Bates worked steadily in television beginning in the 1950s, including an appearance on the syndicated western series The Range Rider, and thereafter on episodes of NBC's Buckskin, Riverboat, and Peter Gunn, as well as the crime drama Sheriff of Cochise, and the aviation adventure series Sky King and Whirlybirds. She also appeared in a 1956 episode of The Lone Ranger entitled "The Cross of Santo Domingo".

In the series premiere, "The Ferris Wheel" (September 23, 1958), of the syndicated television series, Rescue 8, starring Jim Davis and Lang Jeffries, Bates played a woman recently released from a mental institution who is trapped at the top of a Ferris wheel with her young daughter, portrayed by Gina Gillespie. Rand Brooks guest stars in the episode as Tom Hickey. That year she made three appearances on Perry Mason, most notably as Jean Strague in "The Case of the Buried Clock".

In 1960, she was cast as Mrs. Grandsoir in the episode "Mrs. Viner Vanishes" of the ABC/Warner Brothers crime drama Bourbon Street Beat, starring Andrew Duggan. She is more remembered for having portrayed Nurse Wills on the ABC medical drama Ben Casey, from 1961 to 1966. She appeared with John Payne in various roles in five episodes of his NBC western series The Restless Gun, and also guest starred as Mrs. Wayne in the Rawhide episode "Incident of the Tinkers Dam".

Bates, who also taught acting, also appeared in films such as The Strangler (1964), Suppose They Gave a War and Nobody Came (1970), and David Lynch's Eraserhead (1977) as Mrs. X. In July 1982, she appeared on Broadway as Mrs. Bixby in a production of Seven Brides for Seven Brothers. Her last roles were small parts in Die Hard 2 (1990), Grand Canyon (1991), Dream Lover (1994) and Mulholland Drive (2001).

Personal life
Bates married Lew X. Lansworth in 1943 and was married to him until his death in 1981.

Bates was a practicing Episcopalian and she was a registered Republican who supported the administrations of Dwight Eisenhower, Richard Nixon, and Ronald Reagan.

Death
In 2007, Bates died of breast cancer at the Motion Picture & Television Country House and Hospital in Woodland Hills, Los Angeles, California at age 89. Her remains are interred at Forest Lawn Memorial Park, Hollywood Hills, California.

Filmography

References

Notes

Sources

External links

 
 
 
 
Final Taxi Podcast on Jeanne Bates
 The Lew Lansworth papers at the American Heritage Center

1918 births
2007 deaths
American film actresses
American television actresses
Deaths from breast cancer
Actresses from California
Actresses from Berkeley, California
People from Alameda, California
20th-century American actresses
21st-century American actresses
Deaths from cancer in California
Burials at Forest Lawn Memorial Park (Hollywood Hills)
American Episcopalians
California Republicans